A special election was held in  on April 18, 1796, to fill a vacancy left by the resignation of Gabriel Duvall (DR) on March 28, 1796.

Election results

Sprigg took his seat May 5, 1796

See also
List of special elections to the United States House of Representatives

References

Maryland 02
1796 02
Maryland 02
02
United States House of Representatives 1796 02